Eera Veyyil is a 2014 Indian Tamil-language romantic drama film directed by newcomer A. K. Micheal. The film stars Aryan Rajesh and Saranya Nag with Aadukalam Naren, Nizhalgal Ravi, and Pithamagan Mahadevan in supporting roles.

Plot 
Bala is the son of a honest tehsildar. At a temple pond, he sees a girl and splashes water on her. Bala is then taken to the police station since the girl is Priya, the daughter of the Kumbakonam mayor, Krishnamoorthy. Upon hearing this, Priya feels bad for Bala. They both start to have phone conversations and fall in love. When Priya's father learns that Priya is talking with a ruffian, he starts to hunt down Bala with the help of police officer Venugopal. How Bala tries to escape from the police forms the rest of the story.

Cast 

Aryan Rajesh as Bala
Saranya Nag as Priya
Aadukalam Naren as Venugopal
Nizhalgal Ravi as Bala's father
Pithamagan Mahadevan as Krishnamoorthy
Ajay Rathnam as Police commissioner
Meera Krishnan as Priya's mother
Black Pandi as Kutty
Dhamu as Velu
 Ramya as Revathi
Sriranjini as Teacher
Sampath Ram as Police officer
Comagan as Flower seller
Scissor Manohar as Newspaper reader
Crane Manohar as Pharmacist

Production 
The film began production in 2008 under the name Thiruvasagam with newcomer Rajamohan as the director with Album fame Aryan Rajesh and Kaadhal fame Saranya Nag. The film was planned as a Tamil and Telugu bilingual. Charanraj and Suman Setty played supporting roles.

The film was re-launched in 2013 as Eera Veyyil with A. K. Micheal as the director and changes to the supporting cast. The name was changed because the director knew that the name Thiruvasam would have controversy due to the religious meaning of the name. A. K. Micheal ventured into direction with this film. He previously worked as a stills photographer for seven films and as an art director for sixteen films. Businessmen Durai Prabhakaran, Ramesh Ethiraja, Pavesh V. Jain, T. Nedumaran and R. Senthil Kumar produced the film. Aryan Rajesh, who  was last seen in Pokkisham (2009), returns to Tamil cinema with this film. He shot for this film alongside Thuttu and Vedikkai; however, both of those films were never released. Nizhagal Ravi was cast as Rajesh's father. Aadukalam Naren and Pithamagan Mahadevan were cast in important roles.

Soundtrack 
The songs were composed by Jassie Gift in his fourth Tamil film. Vairamuthu wrote the lyrics for all the songs.

References 

2014 films
2014 romantic drama films
Indian romantic drama films
2014 directorial debut films
2010s Tamil-language films